Federation or League of Expellees can refer to the following German organizations:
League of Expellees and Deprived of Rights
Federation of Expellees